Frankie Halton (born 18 June 1996) is an Ireland international rugby league footballer who plays as a  forward for Hull Kingston Rovers in the Super League.

He has previously played at club level for the Swinton Lions and Featherstone Rovers in the Betfred Championship.

Background
Born in Manchester, Halton started his rugby league career in the reserve team at the Leigh Centurions. When the reserve team was discontinued, he was loaned out to the North Wales Crusaders, but Halton chose to return to amateur rugby instead, and spent the next few seasons with Leigh Miners Rangers.

Playing career

Swinton Lions
Halton returned to the professional game in 2019, signing for Swinton Lions.

Featherstone Rovers
In September 2020, Halton signed a two-year contract with Featherstone Rovers.

He reached the 1895 Cup final with Featherstone, but did not play in the final as he was required to self-isolate due to COVID-19.

His final game for the club was in the Million Pound Game against Toulouse.

Hull Kingston Rovers
In July 2021, Halton signed a two-year contract with Hull Kingston Rovers beginning at the start of the 2022 season.

In July 2022, Halton extended his contract with the club until the end of the 2025 season.

References

External links
Hull Kingston Rovers profile
Ireland profile

1996 births
Living people
English rugby league players
Rugby league second-rows
Rugby league players from Manchester
Swinton Lions players
Featherstone Rovers players
Hull Kingston Rovers players
Ireland national rugby league team players